Yeo Min-jeong is a South Korean voice actress.

She joined the On-Media Voice Acting Division's voice acting division in 2000.

She was known voice acting Gaeun Lee from Tooniverse's The Haunted House series.

Personal life

Yeo Min-jeong was born May 13, 1975.

Role

Broadcast TV
  (Tooniverse original network) - Gaeun Lee
 Hello Jadoo (Tooniverse original network) - Choi Jadoo
 Angelic Layer (Korea TV Edition, Tooniverse) - Ringo Seto / Kaede Saito
 Aria The Animation (Korea TV Edition, Animax) - Alice Carroll
 Aria The Natural (Korea TV Edition, Animax) - Alice Carroll
 Aria The Origination (Korea TV Edition, Animax) - Alice Carroll
 Ashita no Nadja (Korea TV Edition, Tooniverse) - Collette Preminger
 Azumanga Daioh (Korea TV Edition, Tooniverse) - Chiyo Mihama
 Bleach (Korea TV Edition, Tooniverse) - Yuzu Kurosaki
 Bratz Kidz: Sleep-Over Adventure (Korea TV Edition, Tooniverse) - Ginger
 Chrono Crusade (Korea TV Edition, Tooniverse) - Azmaria Hendric
 Danny Phantom (Korea TV Edition, Tooniverse) - Jazmine Fenton
 Detective Conan (Korea TV Edition, Tooniverse) - Ayumi Yoshida
 Detective School Q (Korea TV Edition, Tooniverse) - Megumi Minami
 Dokkiri Doctor (Korea TV Edition, Tooniverse) - Kaori Tajima
 Fushigiboshi no Futagohime Gyu! (Korea TV Edition, Tooniverse) - Chiffon
 Galaxy Angel (Korea TV Edition, Animax) - Ranpha Franboise
 Gakuen Alice (Korea TV Edition, Tooniverse) - Hotaru Imai
 Great Teacher Onizuka (Korea TV Edition, Tooniverse) - Nanako Mizuki
 Haré+Guu (Korea TV Edition, Tooniverse) - Guu
 Hell Girl (Korea TV Edition, Animax) - Ai Enma
 Jubei-chan: The Ninja Girl (Korea TV Edition, Tooniverse) - Ayunosuke Odago
 Kanon (Korea TV Edition, Animax) - Kaori Misaka / Mishio Amano
 Lucky Star (Korea TV Edition, Animax) - Akira Kogami
 Magical Meow Meow Taruto (Korea TV Edition, Animax) - Taruto
 Mahōjin Guru Guru (Korea TV Edition, Tooniverse) - Juju
 Mobile Suit Gundam Wing (Korea TV Edition, Tooniverse) - Catherine Bloom
 Miraculous: Tales of Ladybug & Cat Noir (Korea TV Edition, EBS) - Marinette Dupain-Cheng / Ladybug
 Naruto (Korea TV Edition, Tooniverse) - Sakura Haruno
 Ouran High School Host Club (Korea TV Edition, Tooniverse) - Mitsukuni Haninozuka
 Petite Princess Yucie (Korea TV Edition, JEI-TV) - Yucie / Belbel
 Phantom Thief Jeanne (Korea TV Edition, Tooniverse) - Jeanne d`Ark
 Rugrats (Korea TV Edition, EBS) - Angelica Pickles
 Ranma ½ (Korea TV Edition, Tooniverse) - Akane Tendo
 Shrine of the Morning Mist (Korea TV Edition, Tooniverse) - Yukie Uranami
 Shugo Chara! (Korea TV Edition, Tooniverse) - Rima Mashiro
 The Grim Adventures of Billy & Mandy (Korea  TV Edition, Cartoon Network) - Mandy
 To Heart (Korea TV Edition, Tooniverse) - Serika Kurusugawa / Multi
 Toradora! (Korea TV Edition, Animax) - Taiga Aisaka
 Trinity Blood (Korea TV Edition, Tooniverse) - Kate Scott
 UFO Baby (Korea TV Edition, Tooniverse) - Luu
 Yumeiro Patissiere (Korea TV Edition, Tooniverse) - Vanilla

Filmography
 Keroro Gunso the Super Movie - Mirara
 InuYasha the Movie: Affections Touching Across Time - Ruri

Game
 Elsword (MMORPG by KOG) - Ara Haan
 MapleStory (MMORPG by Nexon) - Xenon (female), Roo-D
 Getcha Ghost - Gaeun Lee
 Cookie Run: Kingdom - Pancake Cookie, Croissant Cookie

See also
 Tooniverse

References 

1975 births
Living people
People from Seoul
South Korean voice actresses